A/S Lollandsbanen was a Danish railway company operating the Nykøbing F–Nakskov line mostly on the island of Lolland. Established in 1954, it was based on the remains of Det Lolland-Falsterske Jernbane-Selskab (LFJS). The company received funding from the now defunct Storstrøm County and from the central government.

The company was merged with Vestsjællands Lokalbaner A/S and Østbanen into a new company, Regionstog A/S, on 1 January 2009 and then on 1 July 2015 into Lokaltog A/S.

See also
 Regionstog
 Rail transport in Denmark

References

External links
 Official website

Photos
 LJ at The Railfaneurope.net Picture Gallery

Railway companies established in 1954
Railway companies disestablished in 2009
Defunct railway companies of Denmark